) is a Japanese furniture maker based in Tendō, Yamagata, Japan.

The speciality of Tendo Mokko is making fine furniture that has won design awards from plywood, with some of their items, such as chairs and tables appearing in museums and commanding high prices at furniture auctions.

References

External links

 

Furniture companies of Japan
Companies based in Yamagata Prefecture
Japanese brands